Victoria is a neighborhood in Alexandria, Egypt, named after Queen Victoria. It serves as a transportation hub for eastern Alexandria, containing the easternmost station of line 1 and 2 of the Alexandria tramways, with bus lines and mashrū` routes operating from near the terminal.
 
Victoria hosts the prestigious Victoria College, a private, secular secondary school originally styled after British public schools.

See also 

 Neighborhoods in Alexandria

Populated places in Alexandria Governorate
Neighbourhoods of Alexandria